The following is a list of characters from the novel The Book and the Sword by Jin Yong (Louis Cha). Some of these characters also appear in The Young Flying Fox, another of Jin Yong's works.

Main characters 
 Chen Jialuo is the protagonist. Born in the Chen family of Haining, he was sent to southern Xinjiang at a young age to learn martial arts from Yuan Shixiao. After returning to central China, he joined the Red Flower Society and eventually became its chief after the death of its former chief, Yu Wanting, who was also his godfather. He is described in the novel as a handsome young man with a refined demeanour who is not only highly skilled in martial arts, but also well-versed in the four arts. He also appears in The Young Flying Fox, in which he is mistaken for Fuk'anggan because of their similar appearances.
 Huoqingtong, nicknamed "Emerald Feather and Yellow Dress", is the elder daughter of Muzhuolun, the chief of a Uyghur tribe in southern Xinjiang. Having been trained by Guan Mingmei, she is highly skilled in martial arts, especially in the use of the sword. A resourceful military leader, she has also once led the Uyghurs to victory in one battle against Qing forces even though they were outnumbered. She is described in the novel as a beautiful, charismatic young woman dressed in yellow and wearing a green feather in her hat, hence her nickname.
 Kasili, based on the historical Fragrant Concubine, is Huoqingtong's younger sister. She is described in the novel as having an enchanting, angelic appearance which would make any man stop in his tracks upon seeing her. Kind-hearted and innocent, she exudes a floral fragrance which gives her the name Princess Fragrance.
 The Qianlong Emperor is the main antagonist and the ruler of the Qing Empire. Originally born in the Chen family of Haining, he had been switched places with a newborn daughter of the Yongzheng Emperor shortly after his birth, and had been raised as a prince before he eventually became the emperor. He is described in the novel as a lean, dignified-looking man around the age of 40, and Chen Jialuo feels a sense of familiarity upon meeting him for the first time.

Red Flower Society 
The Red Flower Society is a secret society aiming to overthrow the Manchu-led Qing Empire and restore Han Chinese rule in China. It is led by 15 leaders with Chen Jialuo as their chief.

 Taoist Wuchen, nicknamed "Soul-chasing, Life-taking Sword", is the second leader. Although he has lost his left arm, he retains his formidable prowess in martial arts, specialising in "72 Styles of Soul-chasing and Life-taking Swordplay" and "Linked Mizong Kicks".
 Zhao Banshan, nicknamed "Thousand Arms Buddha", is the third leader. He is originally from the Taiji School of Wenzhou and specialises in Taiji Fist and Taiji Swordplay, as well as the use of anqi (secret projectile weapons).
 Wen Tailai, nicknamed "Thunderbolt Hand", is the fourth leader and Luo Bing's husband. He specialises in the "Thunderbolt Palm" and "Thunderbolt Saber". At the start of the novel, the Qianlong Emperor sends his men to ambush and arrest him to prevent him from revealing the secret behind the emperor's origin. His fellows make several attempts to rescue him before eventually succeeding.
 Chang Hezhi and Chang Bozhi, nicknamed "Black Impermanence" and "White Impermanence" respectively, are a pair of twin brothers who serve as the fifth and sixth leaders respectively. The brothers are originally from the Qingcheng School and specialise in the "Black Sand Palm". They often disguise themselves as the Black and White Guards of Impermanence respectively.
 Xu Tianhong, nicknamed "Martial Zhuge", is the seventh leader who serves as the society's strategist. He was originally at odds with Zhou Qi and often argues with her, but later falls in love with her and marries her after they escape from danger together.
 Yang Chengxie, nicknamed "Iron Pagoda", is the eighth leader. Originally the chief of the Green Flag Gang, he was defeated by Taoist Wuchen, who managed to convince him to join the Red Flower Society. He specialises in using the hard whip.
 Wei Chunhua, nicknamed "Colourful Leopard with Nine Lives", is the ninth leader. He is known for his courage in battle and has never been seriously wounded before, hence his nickname.
 Zhang Jin, nicknamed "Rock Daring", is the hunchbacked tenth leader and the most eccentric among the leaders. He is killed during the battle in the palace at the end of the novel.
 Luo Bing, nicknamed "Mandarin Ducks Saber", is the 11th leader and Wen Tailai's wife. She specialises in using a pair of sabers in combat.
 Shi Shuangying, nicknamed "Ghosts Fret When They See Me", is the 12th leader who specialises in neijia fist styles. Known for his stern and serious demeanour, he serves as the society's chief enforcer of rules.
 Jiang Sigen, nicknamed "Copper-headed Crocodile", is the 13th leader. He specialises in "Lu Zhishen's Crazy Demon Staff" and uses an iron oar in place of a monk's spade.
 Yu Yutong, nicknamed "Golden Flute Scholar", is the 14th leader. He plays the dizi (flute) and uses a golden dizi as his weapon. Having had a crush on Luo Bing for a long time, he attempts to comfort her when her husband is captured, and uses the chance to confess his feelings to her. However, she instantly rejects him and scolds him for having such immoral thoughts, causing him to feel ashamed of himself. At the same time, Yu Yutong is also aware that Li Yuanzhi has romantic feelings for him but he has been treating her coldly all this while because he still maintains his crush on Luo Bing. In the middle of the novel, he feels guilty for having hurt both Luo Bing and Li Yuanzhi emotionally, so he becomes a Buddhist monk to escape from the vicissitudes of life. However, when he learns that the society is in trouble, he decides to return to secular life to help them. With help from his fellows, he eventually accepts Li Yuanzhi's love and marries her.
 Xinyan is Chen Jialuo's servant who later becomes the society's 15th leader.
 Yu Wanting, who is only mentioned by name in the novel as he is already long dead, was Chen Jialuo's godfather and the former chief of the society. He was also a secular member of the Shaolin School.

Wudang School 

 Zhang Zhaozhong, nicknamed "Fiery Hand Judge", is a highly skilled swordsman from the Wudang School. Tempted by wealth and fame, he decides to leave Wudang and serve the Qing government. He becomes a trusted henchman of the Qianlong Emperor and executes his master's orders ruthlessly. He is defeated by Chen Jialuo and his companions in the middle of the novel and taken back to Wudang by Ma Zhen for rehabilitation. He turns against Ma Zhen later and escapes from Wudang. During his final confrontation with the Red Flower Society, he falls into a valley and ends up being devoured by ravenous wolves.
 Ma Zhen is the leader of the Wudang School and the senior of Lu Feiqing and Zhang Zhaozhong. He is also Yu Yutong's martial arts master. When Zhang Zhaozhong was defeated by Chen Jialuo and his friends in the middle of the novel, he pleads with them to spare Zhang Zhaozhong's life and promises that he will rehabilitate his junior. Zhang Zhaozhong later turns against him and defeats him in a duel, blinding him and cutting off his left leg. Ma Zhen eventually commits suicide by smashing his head against a wall.
 Lu Feiqing, nicknamed "Needle in Cotton", is Zhao Banshan's sworn brother and Ma Zhen's junior. Highly skilled in using the sword and anqi (projectile weapons), he was a former anti-Qing resistance fighter and has been a wanted fugitive of the Qing government. He went into hiding by disguising himself as a scholar named "Lu Gaozhi" and becoming a private tutor in Li Yuanzhi's house. One day, Li Yuanzhi chances upon him using his anqi skill and soon learns who he truly is. In exchange for keeping his identity secret, he agrees to train her in martial arts. He becomes a close ally of Chen Jialuo and the Red Flower Society.

Shaolin School 

 Tianhong is the abbot of Shaolin Monastery who spars with Chen Jialuo when the latter visits Shaolin. He is killed when the Qing soldiers attack and burn down the monastery.
 Tianjing is Tianhong's junior who also spars with Chen Jialuo.
 Dachi, Dadian and Daku are three Shaolin monks who spar with Chen Jialuo.

Qing forces 
 Fuk'anggan is a Manchu general who is actually an illegitimate son of the Qianlong Emperor. He resembles his uncle Chen Jialuo in appearance. The emperor appoints him as the Nine Gates Infantry Commander. In the final battle at the palace, he is captured by the Red Flower Society's members, who use him as a hostage to force the emperor to come to a truce with them.
 Bai Zhen, nicknamed "Golden Claw Iron Hook", is a martial artist originally from the Songyang School. He serves as one of the emperor's top bodyguards.
 Chu Yuan, nicknamed "A Reed Crossing the River", is a former Buddhist monk who was expelled from his monastery for violating rules. He serves as one of the emperor's top bodyguards.
 Long Jun is one of the emperor's bodyguards.
 Fan Zhong'en is one of the emperor's bodyguards who is killed by Chen Jialuo.
 Ma Jingxia is one of the emperor's bodyguards. While protecting the emperor, he is stabbed in the heart and killed by Chen Zhengde.
 Rui Dalin is one of the emperor's bodyguards killed by Wen Tailai.
 Cheng Huang is one of the emperor's bodyguards killed by Tianjin.
 Hu Guodong is a famous chief constable from Beijing.
 Li Kexiu is the provincial military commander of Zhejiang and Li Yuanzhi's father.
 Zhaohui is a Manchu general who leads the Qing army to attack southern Xinjiang.
 Heshen is a high-ranking Manchu aristocrat and close aide of the Qianlong Emperor.
 Ji Yun
 Zheng Xie

Scholars, poets and artists 
 Yuan Mei
 Shen Deqian
 Zhao Yi
 Jiang Shiquan
 Li E

Allies and associates of the Red Flower Society

Iron Courage Manor 
Iron Courage Manor is the manor where Zhou Zhongying and his family lived there until it was destroyed in a fire.

 Zhou Zhongying is the manor's master and a reputable martial artist who was trained at the Shaolin School. He kills his only son in anger after learning that the boy has disgraced him, but he deeply regrets later although he constantly tries to hide his remorse. He becomes a close ally of the Red Flower Society and intends to let his son-in-law, Xu Tianhong, become his successor.
 Zhou Zhongying's wife is the mother of Zhou Qi and Zhou Yingjie. She resents her husband and leaves him after he killed their son in anger. Zhou Zhongying deeply regrets his action later and tries to patch up with his wife. With help from Zhou Qi and the Red Flower Society, the Zhou couple eventually reconcile with each other.
 Zhou Qi, nicknamed "Pretty Li Kui", is Zhou Zhongying's daughter. She was originally at odds with Xu Tianhong and often bickers and argues with him. The two of them forge close ties after braving danger and narrowly escaping death together. They are married eventually.
 Zhou Yingjie is Zhou Zhongying's ten-year-old son. Zhang Zhaozhong taunts him when he refuses to reveal Wen Tailai's hiding place. The indignant boy responds to the insults and unsuspectingly spills the beans. Wen Tailai and Luo Bing have no choice but to come out and fight with Zhang Zhaozhong and his men. They are outnumbered and Wen Tailai is injured and captured. Zhou Zhongying was not at home when these events took place. When he returns later and learns that his son had disgraced him by (unintentionally) betraying a fellow martial artist, he is so overwhelmed by fury that he kills his son.
 Meng Jianxiong and An Jiangang are Zhou Zhongying's apprentices.
 Song Shanpeng is Zhou Zhongying's housekeeper.

Others 
 Li Yuanzhi is Li Kexiu's daughter and Lu Feiqing's apprentice. She develops romantic feelings for Yu Yutong but he often gives her the cold shoulder because he has a crush on Luo Bing. Towards the end of the novel, Yu Yutong finally accepts her love and marries her.
 Yuan Shixiao, nicknamed "Eccentric Hero of the Heavenly Pool", is an eccentric martial artist living on Mount Heaven. He teaches Chen Jialuo martial arts and imparts his famous skill, "Hundred Flowers Fist", to Chen. He has a crush on Guan Mingmei and has never given up on her even after she married Chen Zhengde. He often bickers and argues with her husband.
 The "Twin Eagles of Mount Heaven" are a couple living on Mount Heaven. They came to Hangzhou and attempted to assassinate the Qianlong Emperor. They are Chen Zhengde, nicknamed "Bald Vulture"; and Guan Mingmei, nicknamed "Snow Condor". Guan Mingmei is also Huoqingtong's martial arts master.
 Muzhuolun is the chief of the Uyghur tribe and the father of Huoqingtong and Kasili.
 Huo'ayi is Muzhuolun's son and an elder brother of Huoqingtong and Kasili.

"Six Devils of Guandong" 
The "Six Devils of Guandong" are a group of six martial artists from Guandong (Manchuria) who are hired by Bai Zhen to assist him in executing the Qianlong Emperor's order to eliminate the Red Flower Society.
 Teng Yilei is the most fearsome of the six. He is determined to slay any enemy at the expense of his life.
 Gu Jinbiao is a former bandit. His movements cannot be traced and he appears unpredictably.
 Jiao Wenqi is killed by Lu Feiqing. His fellows mistakenly think that the Red Flower Society is responsible for his death and start seeking vengeance on the society.
 Hahetai is a former shepherd from Mongolia.
 Yan Shizhang is killed by Huoqingtong.
 Yan Shikui is Yan Shizhang's younger brother. He is killed by Huoqingtong when the Uyghur tribesmen and the Red Flower Society team up to attack the convoy and seize back the stolen Quran.

Other characters 
 Chen Shiguan, who is mentioned by name only, was an official from Haining who served as Minister of Rites and Grand Secretary of the Wenyuan Library. He was Chen Jialuo's father and the Qianlong Emperor's biological father.
 Xu Chaosheng, who is mentioned by name only, was Chen Shiguan's wife. She was Chen Jialuo's mother and the Qianlong Emperor's biological mother. Although she loved Yu Wanting, she had been forced to marry Chen Shiguan. She entrusted Chen Jialuo to the care of Yu Wanting, who became the boy's godfather.
 Luo Yuantong, nicknamed "Holy Saber", was Luo Bing's father and a highly skilled martial artist known for robbing the rich to help the poor. He is only mentioned by name.
 Bei Renlong is a martial artist nicknamed "Jade Judge" who is killed along with Luo Xin and Jiao Wenqi by Lu Feiqing.
 Luo Xin is a martial artist nicknamed "Iron Armed Arhat" who is killed along with Ben Renlong and Jiao Wenqi by Lu Feiqing.
 Wang Weiyang, nicknamed "My Might Trembles Heshuo", is the leader of the Zhenyuan Security Service based in Beijing. ("Heshuo" refers to an area north of the Yellow River that includes parts of modern Shanxi, Hebei and Shandong.)
 Tong Zhaohe is a member of the Zhenyuan Security Service who accompanies the soldiers to arrest Wen Tailai. He also burns down Iron Courage Manor and kidnaps Zhou Qi's mother. He is eventually killed by Xu Tianhong and Zhou Qi.
 Han Wenchong is a martial artist who owns a swift steed. The horse is stolen by Luo Bing when he stops to take a break.
 Sixth Master Tang is a martial artist nicknamed "Candy with Frosted Arsenic". He is killed by Zhou Qi.
 Yuruyi is a courtesan from Hangzhou who entertains the Qianlong Emperor during his meeting with Chen Jialuo. She seduces the emperor and lures him into a trap, where he is captured by the Red Flower Society and held hostage in the Liuhe Pagoda.
 Effendi, based on Nasreddin, is an eccentric bearded old man who rides a donkey. He is highly skilled in martial arts and qinggong.
 "Four Tigers of Hulun"

See also
 List of organisations in wuxia fiction

Lists of Jin Yong characters
The Book and the Sword
Fictional Qing dynasty people